Bagar is a small village in Pauri Garhwal district in the Indian state of Uttarakhand. The population of Bagar is around 1,275, 644 being male, and 631 being female; 247 children, ages 0 to 6, live there as of 2011. Literacy rates run around an average of 53.4%, with 66.8% for men and 40.12% for women. Bagar covers a wide geographical area of 155.22 hectares.

The main source of income is agriculture. The village has a primary and secondary school, which is common for many villages around. Few children attend the school because of migration of citizens to nearby towns and cities. Children go to Rikhnikhal / Siddhkhal for senior schooling.

There are two temples there which resemble Mata Sherawali Mandir.

References

Hindu pilgrimage sites in India
Tourism in Uttarakhand
Villages in Pauri Garhwal district